Rifle Sport was an American post punk band active in the 1980s and 1990s, from Minneapolis, Minnesota.

The band took its name from an arcade in downtown Minneapolis which was open in the 1940s to 1960s. An unrelated art gallery, Rifle Sport Gallery, also named after the arcade and housed in its old space, established their name after the band.

The drummer and vocalist Todd Trainer later joined the Big Black front man Steve Albini's band, Shellac.

Rifle Sport was honored with a star on the outside mural of the Minneapolis nightclub First Avenue, recognizing performers that have played sold-out shows or have otherwise demonstrated a major contribution to the culture at the iconic venue. Receiving a star "might be the most prestigious public honor an artist can receive in Minneapolis," according to journalist Steve Marsh. Unlike most of the other stars on the mural, Rifle Sport's is hidden from view, underneath the awning of the door to the 7th Street Entry.

Discography

Studio albums
Voice of Reason (Reflex) (1983)
White (Made in France) (Ruthless Records (1987)
Live at the Entry, Dead at the Exit (Ruthless) (1989)
Primo (Big Money-Ruthless) (1991)

Singles and EPs
"Plan 39/Dub" 7" (Ruthless) (1985)
"Complex EP" (Ruthless) (1985)
"Little Drummer Boy/Shanghaied" 7" (Big Money) (1991)

Compilations
Barefoot & Pregnant CD v/a compilation (Reflex) (1998) - "Angel Tears", "No Money"
Kitten: A Compilation v/a compilation (Reflex) (1999) - "Keep On Workin'", "Church"

See also
List of alternative rock artists
Music of Minnesota
Flour
Breaking Circus

References

External links
 [ Allmusic]

Alternative rock groups from Minnesota
Indie rock musical groups from Minnesota
Musical groups established in 1982
Ruthless Records (Chicago) artists
1982 establishments in Minnesota